A state fair is an annual competitive and recreational gathering of a U.S. state's population, usually held in late summer or early fall.  It is a larger version of a county fair, often including only exhibits or competitors that have won in their categories at the more-local county fairs.

State fairs began in the nineteenth century for the purpose of promoting state agriculture, through competitive exhibitions of livestock and display of farm products. As the U.S. evolved from a predominantly agrarian to an industrial society in the twentieth century, and the more service economy of the 21st century,  modern state fairs have expanded to include carnival amusement rides and games, display of industrial products, automobile racing, and entertainment such as musical concerts. Large fairs can admit more than a million visitors over the course of a week or two. The first U.S. state fair was that of New York, held in 1841 in Syracuse, and has been held annually to the present year. The second state fair was in Detroit, Michigan, which ran from 1849 to 2009.

Events similar to state fairs are also held annually in each state capital in Australia, known as royal shows. Australian royal shows are organized by state agricultural and horticultural societies, and are described further in the agricultural show article.

List of state fairs

United States

Notes

State fair police departments
Several state fairs maintain their own police departments, including:
California Exposition and State Fair Police
Iowa State Fair Police
Minnesota State Fair Police Department
Wisconsin State Fair Park Police Department

Provincial exhibitions in Canada

A few annual exhibitions in the summer in Canada are similar to state fairs in the United States:

Awards
State and county fairs are famous for a variety of competitions that award ribbons. Awards are generally given according to the following scale:
 First place – blue ribbon
 Second place – red ribbon
 Third place – white ribbon
 Fourth place – yellow ribbon
 Fifth place – green ribbon
 Sixth place – orange ribbon
Seventh place – purple ribbon
Eighth place – brown ribbon

Attendance
As of 2019, the largest attendance at a state fair in the USA is in Texas with the fair having attracted  2,514,637 visitors.

The largest average per day attendance is at the Minnesota State Fair averaging just under 200,000 people per day.

See also
 Agricultural show
 Rodeo
 Trade fair
 World's fair

References

 
American culture
Canadian culture
Annual fairs
Annual events in the United States